Kumba is a metropolitan city in the Meme department, Southwest Region, Western Cameroon, commonly referred to as "K-town" colloquially. Kumba is the largest and most developed city in the Meme Department and is increasingly drawing in residents from the local villages such as Mbonge. It is also the largest urban area in the  South-West. Kumba has an estimated population of about 400,000 with three quarters of this population being young due to advancement in medicine and lowering infant mortality. The N8 and N16 highways meet at Kumba.

Etymology 
The name 'Kumba' originates from the Bafo word 'kumbè', meaning an umbrella tree

History
According to local mythology, Kumba was founded by the hunter Midiki Bokeng, In his honour a monument has been put up around the Town Green. Kumba was originally a Bafo tribal capital formed after the Mediki wars. Mediki was a Bafo native sent by the Bafo chief Nguti to fight other tribes around the settlement which he did successfully. Mediki fought together with Eseme Modu and capture territories as far as Ekombe. The settlement of Kumba was capital of former Rio Del Rey Division in German Cameroon and continued to exist into the British period. Abel Mukete, a local Bafo chief, became the head of native authority in the district, beginning in the 1890s and even became the first Paramount Chief in 1929. The title was passed down to his eldest son, John Mukete and mext to Nfon Victor E Mukete (the CEO of Camtel). The chief of Kumba is the paramount chief of the Bafo.

On the 24th October 2020, a mass shooting took place at a school, 7 died and 13 were injured.

Economy
Kumba is a trade centre for cocoa, palm oil and rubber, and has a timber industry as well. Kumba is a local road junction, making it the main commercial town in Anglophone Cameroon. It has two main markets, Kumba Market and Fiango Market, and several smaller markets created by farmers who bring food directly from their farms, such as the Mbonge Road market, Three Corners market, and the Back Market. Due to the high level of activity in the city, it has attracted Nigerian traders, particularly the Igbo and Yoruba who own more than 60% of the shops in the town, according to a 2011 survey. Trade is controlled by the Kumba City Council, trade revenue accounts for most of the city's budget. Most of the people in Kumba are farmers and therefore Kumba has become a major trade centre with traders and businesspeople flocking from across Cameroon, and even as far as Nigeria, Equatorial Guinea, Gabon and Chad for Kumba's trade.

Geography

Kumba is the largest town in the Meme Department and Southwest Region of Cameroon. It is situated on flat lands around the Buea Road area with hills around Fiango and Mbonge Road. There are three main water bodies: Lake Barombi Mbo, which is the largest volcanic lake in Cameroon and a tourist attraction, Kumba Water that passes through Buea Road at the Kumba Mbeng bridge, And the Mbanga Water, running through the city, the local nickname of the Mbanga is the Mabonjise. Most major roads to the nearby villages start at Kumba, running to the Nigerian border at Mamfe, the Korup National Park at Mundemba, and Mount Koupe to the east.

Administration

Kumba is the capital of the Meme department of the Southwest Region. It has three sub-divisional councils: Kumba 1 (Kumba Town-Kake, a part of Buea Road), Kumba 2 (Kosala, Hausa-quarters and Fiango) and Kumba 3 (Three Corners, Mambanda and a part of Buea Road), each has a local mayor. The town is also run by a government appointed Senior Divisional Officer (SDO) and a [[National Assembly (Cameroon)|government delegate].

Transport

Kumba is the terminus of a branch railway of the western system of Camrail. Kumba has three major motor parks: one situated at Buea road in Barombi Kang, the second at Fiango (Three Corners), and the third on Mbonge road (Mile One).

People and Culture

Languages

The majority of the Kumba people speak English, Pidgin and to a lesser extent, French, and a sizeable amount of indigenous languages, most presently the Bafaw, Bakundu, Bakossi and Mbonge.

The ethnic groups of Kumba are the Bafaw and the Bakundus. Bafaw is an ethnic group who speak Lifaw, a language similar to Duala, and the Bakundu ethnic group who speak the Bakundu language (Orocko language), Mboh, Bakundu Language and Bakossi, and certainly Southern Bantoid. Due to the city's cosmopolitan nature, the Bafaw and the Bakundu now form just a percentage of the general population of the city, and have lost many aspects of their culture, except for their language which is spoken mostly by the elderly and some of the younger generation.

See also
Railway stations in Cameroon

References

Communes of Southwest Region (Cameroon)